Elections to Newry and Mourne District Council were held on 15 May 1985 on the same day as the other Northern Irish local government elections. The election used five district electoral areas to elect a total of 30 councillors.

Election results

Note: "Votes" are the first preference votes.

Districts summary

|- class="unsortable" align="centre"
!rowspan=2 align="left"|Ward
! % 
!Cllrs
! % 
!Cllrs
! %
!Cllrs
! %
!Cllrs
! %
!Cllrs
! %
!Cllrs
!rowspan=2|TotalCllrs
|- class="unsortable" align="center"
!colspan=2 bgcolor="" | SDLP
!colspan=2 bgcolor="" | UUP
!colspan=2 bgcolor="" | Sinn Féin
!colspan=2 bgcolor="" | DUP
!colspan=2 bgcolor="" | IIP
!colspan=2 bgcolor="white"| Others
|-
|align="left"|Crotlieve
|bgcolor="#99FF66"|54.2
|bgcolor="#99FF66"|4
|18.0
|2
|0.0
|0
|6.9
|0
|0.0
|0
|20.9
|1
|7
|-
|align="left"|Newry Town
|bgcolor="#99FF66"|45.0
|bgcolor="#99FF66"|4
|12.6
|1
|19.3
|1
|0.0
|0
|15.3
|1
|7.8
|0
|7
|-
|align="left"|Slieve Gullion
|44.8
|3
|0.0
|0
|bgcolor="#008800"|47.5
|bgcolor="#008800"|2
|0.0
|0
|4.6
|0
|3.1
|0
|5
|-
|align="left"|The Fews
|30.9
|2
|bgcolor="40BFF5"|35.0
|bgcolor="40BFF5"|2
|18.9
|1
|7.9
|1
|0.8
|0
|6.5
|0
|6
|-
|align="left"|The Mournes
|26.6
|1
|bgcolor="40BFF5"|34.2
|bgcolor="40BFF5"|2
|12.8
|1
|26.4
|1
|0.0
|0
|0.0
|0
|5
|- class="unsortable" class="sortbottom" style="background:#C9C9C9"
|align="left"| Total
|40.9
|14
|20.2
|7
|18.5
|5
|7.8
|2
|4.2
|1
|8.4
|1
|30
|-
|}

District results

Crotlieve

1985: 4 x SDLP, 2 x UUP, 1 x Independent Nationalist

Newry Town

1985: 4 x SDLP, 1 x Sinn Féin, 1 x IIP, 1 x UUP

Slieve Gullion

1985: 3 x SDLP, 2 x Sinn Féin

The Fews

1985: 2 x UUP, 2 x SDLP, 1 x Sinn Féin, 1 x DUP

The Mournes

1985: 2 x UUP, 1 x SDLP, 1 x DUP, 1 x Sinn Féin

References

Newry and Mourne District Council elections
Newry and Mourne